Luca Zaia (born 27 March 1968) is a Venetian and Venetist politician, who has been President of Veneto since 2010.

Prior to that, Zaia was President of the Province of Treviso from 1998 to 2005, Vice President of Veneto from 2005 to 2008 and Minister of Agriculture in Silvio Berlusconi's fourth cabinet from 2008 to 2010.

Political career 
Luca Zaia joined Liga Veneta–Lega Nord in the early 1990s, after having met Gian Paolo Gobbo, and was first elected to public office in 1993, when he became municipal councillor of Godega di Sant'Urbano. Two years later, in 1995, he successfully ran for provincial councillor and, after the election, was appointed provincial minister of Agriculture.

In the 1998 provincial election, Zaia was elected President of the Province of Treviso with 60.0% of the vote in the second round, after arriving ahead in the first round with 41.4% and refusing to accept the support of any other party other than his own. At the time, he was the youngest provincial president of Italy. In 2002 he was re-elected with a landslide 68.9% of the vote in the second round and continued to govern the province with the sole support of his party.

In May 2005, Zaia was appointed Vice President of Veneto and regional minister of Agriculture and Tourism in Giancarlo Galan's third government, but left in May 2008 in order to take office as federal Minister of Agriculture in Berlusconi IV Cabinet.

In December 2009, The People of Freedom (PdL) determined that the coalition candidate in the 2010 regional election would be a member of Lega Nord. Subsequently, the national council of Liga Veneta (LV) nominated Zaia for President of the region.

President of Veneto
In the 2010 regional election Zaia was elected President of Veneto by winning 60.2% of the vote.

In the 2015 regional election Zaia was re-elected President of Veneto with 50.1%, despite the split occurred in his party when Flavio Tosi, who later won 11.9% of the vote, left in order to form the Tosi List for Veneto.

In the 2020 regional election Zaia was re-elected for a third consecutive term with 76.8% of the vote, becoming the most voted regional President ever in Italy. Additionally, Zaia's personal list won 44.6% of the vote, while the party's official list won 16.9%.

Social issues
In early times of his administration, Zaia tried to limit the RU-486 abortive pill. However, the Italian Medicines Agency declared that his position was unconstitutional in view of how the question is regulated by the Law 194 of 1978.

In 2013 Zaia spoke against the LGBT adoption, saying: "I have nothing against gays, but the possibility of adoption seems to me to be an extreme measure with unpredictable effects."

Zaia however liberalised artificial insemination for women up to 50 years.

Economic issues
In August 2010, an anti-globalization group demonstrated in Vivaro against the planting of genetically modified organisms. The demonstration was supported by Zaia, who demanded a "return to legality", even though his predecessor Giancarlo Galan, a member of his coalition, was in favour of GMOs.

After a flood in 2010, Zaia and his coalition changed a regional law to permit the reconstruction of rural ruins up to 800 cubic metres. The Democratic Party claimed that this was an attempt at "cementification". The National Association of Building Constructors (ANCE) also called the law a "bad choice".

Zaia was criticized when, after the flood, he asked for more funds for the reconstruction, saying, "It's a shame spending €250,000,000 for four stones in Pompei."

Venetian independence
Zaia announced that he too had voted (yes) in the unofficial, non-binding, online and privately organised 2014 Venetian independence referendum and explained that he would seek "total independence" for Veneto. Zaia has compared the status of the Veneto within Italy to that of Crimea within Ukraine.

Venetian autonomy
Zaia was a strong proponent of and oversaw the 2017 Venetian autonomy referendum, in which turnout was 57.2% and 98.1% of participants voted "yes".

Covid-19 outbreak
In February 2020 Zaia apologized after criticizing China over the COVID-19 pandemic and claiming that Chinese people "eat live mice". Zaia has anyway emerged strengthened from the crisis, widely praised for keeping hospital admissions down.

Miscellaneous
In the occasion of the 2011 referendums on four questions concerning the repeal of recent laws regarding the privatisation of water services (two questions), a return to the nuclear energy which had been phased out after the 1987 referendum, and criminal procedure, specifically a provision exempting the Prime Minister and the Ministers from appearing in court, he voted "4 Yes". He called for more transparency and demanded more citizens' supervision of public administration.

Personal life
Luca Zaia was born on 27 March 1968 in the Province of Treviso. In 1993, he received a degree in the science of animal production at the veterinary college of the University of Udine before attending a managerial course. He paid his studies by working as a commercial for local discothèques.

In 1998 Zaia married Raffaella Monti. The couple has no children. Zaia loves to ride horses and had one for 19 years.

In August 2006, when he was the Vice President of Veneto, Zaia saved an Albanian citizen who was wedged in a burning car.

See also
Regional Governments led by Luca Zaia:
First Zaia government
Second Zaia government
Third Zaia government

References

External links

Official website

1968 births
Living people
Presidents of Veneto
Presidents of the Province of Treviso
Agriculture ministers of Italy
Venetist politicians
Venetian independence activists
Lega Nord politicians
People from Conegliano
Members of the Regional Council of Veneto
20th-century Italian politicians
21st-century Italian politicians